Newlands is a rural locality in the Whitsunday Region, Queensland, Australia.

Geography
Starvation Creek enters from Eungella Hinterland to the east, and flows north-west to become the Bowen River. A branch of the creek forms part of the north-eastern boundary, and the river forms much of the northern boundary.
The Newlands coal mine is in the south of the locality.

Road infrastructure
The Bowen Developmental Road (State Route 77) runs through from north to south-west.

References 

Whitsunday Region
Localities in Queensland